Marktplaats.nl is a classified advertising site based in the Netherlands, started in 1999. The word means market place in Dutch. Having been part of eBay for 16 years, it was acquired by Adevinta in July 2020.

History
The website was created in 1999 by Rene van Mullem. Initially, posting classified ads was offered as a free service. The site quickly grew in popularity and started attracting many visitors that posted more and more classified ads.  At the end of 1999, Van Mullem sold the website Marktplaats.nl for ƒ600,000 -ca. €273,000- to the company Het Goed from Emmeloord, a Dutch national chain of Charity shops led by Bob Crébas. 

On November 10, 2004 Het Goed sold for the website for €225 million to American Internet giant eBay.

By 2010 the community was posting over 260,000 classified ads every day and the platform counted over 6 million active ads.

In June 2020, Marktplaats was bought by the Norwegian company Adevinta, as part of the $9.2 Billion transaction between Adevinta and eBay, for the take over the advertising arm of eBay (eBay Classifieds Group).

References

External links
Marktplaats.nl
English information on eBay Classified Group

Online marketplaces of the Netherlands
Companies based in Amsterdam
Dutch-language websites
EBay
1999 establishments in the Netherlands
2004 mergers and acquisitions